The events of 2001 in anime.

Accolades
At the Mainichi Film Awards, Spirited Away won the Animation Film Award and Kujira Tori won the Ōfuji Noburō Award. Internationally, Blood: The Last Vampire was nominated for the Annie Award for Best Animated Feature.

Releases 
This list contains numerous notable entries of anime which debuted in 2001. It is not a complete list and represents popular works that debuted as TV, OVA and Movie releases. Web content, DVD specials, TV specials are not on this list.

Films 
A list of anime that debuted in theaters between January 1 and December 31, 2001.

Television series 
A list of anime television series that debuted between January 1 and December 31, 2001.

Original video animations 
A list of original video animations that debuted between January 1 and December 31, 2001.

See also
2001 in animation

External links 
Japanese animated works of the year, listed in the IMDb

Years in anime
2001 in animation
2001 in Japan